Mark Higgins (born 21 May 1971) is a Manx rally driver competing in the British Rally Championship. His co-driver was Rory Kennedy.

Career
Higgins was born on the Isle of Man on 21 May 1971.  He began his career in motorsport at the age of nine when he took up karting helped by his mother and father.

By the age of 17, Higgins had competed in a range of motor sport activities such as trial bikes and karts. At 17 Higgins began his professional motorsport career with a trip to Sweden to learn from Timo Mäkinen and Anders Kulläng.

He has won the British Rally Championship three times, 1997, 2005, 2006.

In 2016, Higgins piloted a Subaru WRX-STI Time Attack car to a new lap record around the Isle of Man TT Mountain Course. His time of 17 minutes 35 seconds beat his previous record by nearly two minutes.

Other work
Higgins has worked for many years with Top Gear's former Stig Ben Collins on various film and television sequences. Higgins was a stunt driver for the James Bond films Quantum of Solace, Skyfall Spectre and No Time to Die.

Higgins also appears as a stunt driver and on-camera in the fifth episode of Amazon's The Grand Tour.

Personal life
Higgins lives in Powys, Mid-Wales, with his wife and two children. With his brother and father, he was also a partner in the family rally school located in Carno, near Newtown, Powys.

Racing record

Complete WRC results

PWRC results

WRC-2 results

Complete FIA World Rallycross Championship results
(key)

Supercar

References

External links

 
 Stobart Motorsport
 Profile on ewrc-results.com

1971 births
Living people
Manx racing drivers
People from Montgomeryshire
Sportspeople from Powys
British rally drivers
World Rally Championship drivers
World Rallycross Championship drivers
British stunt performers
Porsche Carrera Cup GB drivers
British rally co-drivers